Ahmed Ibrahim (born 4 February 1966) is a retired Qatari long-distance runner who specialized in the 3000 and 5000 metres.

Biography
Although Warsama has been naturalised as a Qatari citizen, he is a Dhulbahante from Xudun. He has medals from the Asian Championships, the Gulf Cooperation Council Championships, the West Asian Games and the Pan Arab Championships.

International competitions

Personal bests
1500 metres - 3:35.38 min (1994)
3000 metres - 7:43.00 min (2000)
5000 metres - 13:13.52 min (2000)
10,000 metres - 28:02.80 min (2003)

References

External links

1966 births
Living people
Qatari male long-distance runners
Olympic athletes of Qatar
Athletes (track and field) at the 1988 Summer Olympics
Athletes (track and field) at the 2000 Summer Olympics
Asian Games medalists in athletics (track and field)
Athletes (track and field) at the 2002 Asian Games
Athletes (track and field) at the 1998 Asian Games
Athletes (track and field) at the 1994 Asian Games
World Athletics Championships athletes for Qatar
Naturalised citizens of Qatar
Asian Games silver medalists for Qatar
Medalists at the 1994 Asian Games
Medalists at the 1998 Asian Games
Medalists at the 2002 Asian Games